Major Grey's Chutney is a type of chutney, reputedly created by a 19th-century British Army officer of the same name who, though likely apocryphal, presumably lived in British India. Its characteristic ingredients are mango, raisins, vinegar, lime juice, onion, tamarind extract (occasionally), sweetening, and spices. 

It has been described as a mild chutney compared to others that have a spicier flavour profile. In 1982, Major Grey's Chutney was described as being the most popular type of chutney used in the United States.

The product was long associated with Sharwood’s Mango Chutney, Major Grey version, but this is no longer manufactured for sale in the United Kingdom.

Commercial varieties

Commercial Major Grey's Chutney products typically contain similar ingredients, with some variations occurring in the formulations of the various products.

India
Major Grey's Mango Chutney is manufactured by Sun Brand in India and by Desai Brothers Ltd. in Poona, India under the brand name Mother's Recipe, and has been exported to Singapore.Originally all Indian condiments were fiery hot. Hence they were too spicy for the European settlers' palates. It is reputed that a British army major named Grey had a sweet variety of mango chutney made especially to suit his taste. Thus Major Grey Chutney is thought to have been born, made by Merwanjee Poonjiajee, established in the year 1876. Mango chutney & curry powder made under the "SUN BRAND" were some of the first of their kind to be exported from India.

North America
A number of manufacturers mass-produce a "Major Grey's Mango Chutney" for sale in the United States and Canada, for example Patak's and Sharwood's. One of the oldest brands, reputedly the first manufacturer to popularise the chutney in the West, is Crosse & Blackwell, now partly owned by the J.M. Smucker Company. It has been suggested that Crosse & Blackwell purchased the formulation for Major Grey's Chutney, "probably in the early 1800s".

See also

 Anglo-Indian cuisine
 Earl Grey tea
 Green mango chutney
 List of chutneys

References

Further reading

External links

 Major Grey's Chutney. Saveur.
 Chutney. Recipezaar.com.

Brand name condiments
Premier Foods brands
Anglo-Indian cuisine
Sn